Faiyum or Fayoum or Fayyum may refer to:

 Faiyum, a city in the Faiyum Oasis in Middle Egypt.
 Faiyum Oasis, in the Faiyum region in Egypt.
 Faiyum Governorate, one of the governorates of Egypt.
 The Fayyum Fragment, a papyrus fragment located there.
 Faiyum SC, Egyptian football club in Faiyum 
 Faiyum Stadium, multi-purpose stadium in Faiyum
 Faiyum University (FU), Egyptian public university in Faiyum

Others
Fayyum Fragment, a papyrus fragment containing text that could be from part of the New Testament, and consists of about 100 Greek letters. The fragment was originally discovered in Al-Fayyum, Egypt
 Faiyum mummy portraits, naturalistic painted portraits associated with mummies found in the Faiyum area.